Uproot may refer to:

Uproot, Vine pull schemes
Uproot, movement in Wing Chun martial art
Uproot (album), by DJ /rupture